The X Factor is the tenth studio album by English heavy metal band Iron Maiden, released on 2 October 1995 through EMI Records. CMC International released the album in North America. It is the first of two albums by the band to include Blaze Bayley, formerly of Wolfsbane, as vocalist, replacing Bruce Dickinson who left the band following their previous tour to pursue a solo career. It also saw the departure of the band's longtime producer Martin Birch, who retired shortly after the release of their previous album, Fear of the Dark (1992). The album takes a darker tone than the band's first nine releases, due to the lyrics being based on personal issues surrounding Steve Harris at the time, who was in the midst of a divorce. This is reflected in the cover artwork, which graphically depicts the band's mascot, Eddie, being vivisected by a machine.

Background

The album title came about at the start of the recording. According to producer Nigel Green: "We all felt that the way things were progressing – the songs, Blaze's new involvement, the sound, the commitment – the new album really would have that extra quality, that bit of magic, that 'X Factor'. This became the working title for the album and we liked it, so we kept it. It is also very apt as this is our tenth studio album and "X" can bring up many images."

The cover art, depicting Eddie undergoing another lobotomy, was created by Hugh Syme. Due to the cover's "lifelike" style, the band was forced to release the album in a reversible sleeve, with a less graphic view of Eddie from a distance.

The album was the last until 2015's The Book of Souls to use the classic variant of the band's logo: every studio release from Virtual XI to The Final Frontier used an alternate that removed the extended ends of the "R", "M", and both "N's".

The X Factor is also unusual in that it yielded several band compositions that did not make it onto the album. "We actually ended up doing 14 songs and we used eleven," said Steve Harris, "which is very unusual for us." The three songs that did not make the cut, "I Live My Way", "Justice of The Peace" and "Judgement Day," were released as B-sides to the album’s singles. The latter two would also be featured on the Best of the 'B' Sides collection.

The X Factor was Maiden's tenth consecutive UK top ten album but spent only four weeks on the chart – making it their shortest-staying studio album.

The band supported the album by touring. Much like the tour for the following album, Virtual XI, several dates in the United States were canceled as Bayley suffered from occasional vocal issues from the band's heavy concert schedule.

Song details
"Man on the Edge" and "Lord of the Flies" were released as singles. Both of these songs, and "Sign of the Cross," remained in Iron Maiden set lists following Bruce Dickinson's return. Live versions of these songs with Dickinson on vocals can be found on "The Wicker Man" single and the live albums Death on the Road, Rock in Rio and Nights of the Dead respectively, while the same live takes of "Man on the Edge" and "Sign of the Cross" were later re-released on Iron Maiden's 2011 compilation album From Fear to Eternity.

"The Edge of Darkness" is based on the 1979 film Apocalypse Now, adapted from Joseph Conrad's Heart of Darkness, "Man on the Edge" is based on the 1993 movie Falling Down, and "Lord of the Flies" is based on the William Golding novel of the same name. "Sign of the Cross" is based on the Umberto Eco's novel The Name of the Rose. Live recordings of "Blood on the World's Hands" and "The Aftermath" from the X Factor were issued as B-sides and also on the Best of the 'B' Sides compilation.

Blaze Bayley later recorded a re-arranged version of "Sign of the Cross" on the live album As Live as It Gets.

Critical reception

The X Factor was met with lukewarm responses from critics. AllMusic rated the album two stars out of five, stating that "suffering from a lack of powerful riffs and tightly written songs, The X Factor is a lackluster latter-day album from Iron Maiden. Although the band doesn't sound particularly bad on the record, they don't sound inspired and there's a noticeable lack of energy to the performances which makes the lack of imagination all the more apparent."

Sputnikmusic were somewhat more positive about the release, deeming the album "a change for Iron Maiden, and a very important one at that" as it "paved the way for future albums of similar length". They also praised the "often criticized" Blaze Bayley, whose voice they claimed "was perfect for the new release."

Track listing

Personnel
Production and performance credits are adapted from the album liner notes.

Iron Maiden
Blaze Bayley – vocals
Dave Murray – guitars
Janick Gers – guitars
Steve Harris – bass, production, mixing
Nicko McBrain – drums

Additional musicians
Michael Kenney – keyboards
The Xpression Choir – Gregorian chants on "Sign of the Cross"

Production
Nigel Green – producer, engineer, mixing
Ronal Whelan – mastering
Mick McKenna – assistant engineer
Les Lambert – assistant engineer
Hugh Syme – digital illustration, sleeve design, art direction
Ross Halfin – photography
Simon Fowler – photography
Tony Frederick – photography
Rod Smallwood – management
Merck Mercuriadis – management
Andy Taylor – management
Aky Najeeb – management
Harry Mohan – management

Charts

Weekly charts

Certifications

References

1995 albums
Iron Maiden albums
EMI Records albums
Albums recorded in a home studio